Kosmos 2 ( meaning Cosmos 2), also known as 1MS No.1 and occasionally in the West as Sputnik 12 was a technology demonstration and a scientific research satellite launched by the Soviet Union in 1962. It was the second satellite to be designated under the Kosmos system, and the first spacecraft to be launched as part of the MS programme.

Spacecraft
Its primary missions were to develop systems for future satellites, and to record data about cosmic rays and radiation. It had a mass of 285 kg.

Mission
It was launched aboard Kosmos-2I 63S1 s/n 5LK. It was the fourth flight of the Kosmos-2I, and the second to successfully reach orbit. The launch was conducted from Mayak-2 at Kapustin Yar, and occurred at 17:16:00 GMT on 6 April 1962. It decayed on 20 August 1963.

Kosmos 2 was a 1MS satellite, the first of two to be launched. The second was launched on 25 October 1962 but failed to reach orbit. The 1MS was the first of two types of MS satellite to be launched and was succeeded by the 2MS satellite.

See also

 1962 in spaceflight

References

Spacecraft launched in 1962
1962 in the Soviet Union
Kosmos 0002
Spacecraft which reentered in 1963